The Netherlands Economic Medal Cabinet (Nederlands Economisch PenningKabinet / NEPK) is located in Rotterdam, at Erasmus University Rotterdam – campus Woudestein.

History 
NEPK was created on June 15, 1961. Its founder is dr. W.L. (Willem Lyckele) Groeneveld Meijer (1897–1963), former director of the Economic Institute for Retail (Economisch Instituut voor de Middenstand) and Secretary General of the Ministry of Economic Affairs. The 250 medals collected by Groeneveld Meijer during his active career formed the start of the NEPK collection.
Being an alumnus of the Netherlands School of Commerce (Nederlandsche Handels-Hoogeschool / NHH) and having defended his dissertation at NHH in 1924, Groeneveld Meijer decided in 1963 to transfer the Foundation NEPK and his medal collection to his alma mater, since 1939 known as the Netherlands School of Economics (Nederlandse Economische Hogeschool / NEH). In 1973 NEH merged into Erasmus University Rotterdam, which is now the owner of the NEPK medal collection.

Mission statement 
The mission statement of the Foundation NEPK formulated at its creation can be summarized as “bringing together, acquiring, expanding and maintaining a collection of (Dutch) medals, in particular medals from 1900 onwards that were created with a motive of an economic nature”.
Over the years, the scope has somewhat broadened, notably to include medals related to Erasmus University Rotterdam and the person Desiderius Erasmus.

Collection 
The NEPK collection is housed at Erasmus University Rotterdam, campus Woudestein. Two medal presentations can be viewed in the Erasmus Gallery in the Erasmus Building. These presentations make use of interactive touchscreen display cases. (Opening Monday-Friday 9.00 – 17.00 hours; free entrance).
New presentations are made regularly. The website of NEPK (www.nepk.nl) allows to search the NEPK collection database of presently over 2000 medals. In principle the database contains all medals in the collection.

Curators 
 1961 - 1963 dr. W.L. Groeneveld Meijer
 1963 ‐ 1996 prof. J.R. Zuidema
 1996 ‐ 2006 prof. G.W. de Wit
 2006 ‐         dr. H. Gerritsen

References 
Herman Gerritsen: www.nepk.nl. A publicly searchable medal collection. In: De Beeldenaar, vol. 40 (2016, pp 115-188) (in Dutch).

External links 
 www.nepk.nl NEPK collection

Erasmus University Rotterdam
Museums in Rotterdam